Yao Di (姚迪; born 15 August 1992, in Tianjin), is a Chinese volleyball player. She is the setter of China women's national volleyball team，and plays for Tianjin Bohai Bank and Savino del Bene Scandicci.

Career
Yao won the 2013 FIVB U23 World Championship and named Most Valuable Player and best setter. She participated in the 2015 FIVB World Grand Prix. and 2019 Montreux Volley Masters,

Clubs
  Tianjin
  Savino del Bene Scandicci

Awards

Individuals
 2011 U20 World Championship "Best Setter"
 2011 Asian Women's Club Volleyball Championship "Best Setter"
 2012 Asian Women's Club Volleyball Championship "Best Setter"
 2013 U23 World Championship "Most Valuable Player"
 2013 U23 World Championship "Best Setter"
 2015–16 Chinese Women's Volleyball Super League "Best Setter"
 2017 Asian Women's Club Volleyball Championship "Best Setter"
 2017–18 Chinese Women's Volleyball Super League "Best Setter"
 2019 Asian Women's Club Volleyball Championship "Best Setter"
 2019-20 Chinese Women's Volleyball Super League "Best Setter"
 2021–22 Chinese Women's Volleyball Super League "Best Setter"
 2022–23 Chinese Women's Volleyball Super League "Best Setter"

References

External links
 FIVB Biography

Chinese women's volleyball players
Living people
1992 births
Volleyball players from Tianjin
Asian Games medalists in volleyball
Volleyball players at the 2014 Asian Games
Volleyball players at the 2018 Asian Games
Sportspeople from Tianjin
Medalists at the 2014 Asian Games
Medalists at the 2018 Asian Games
Asian Games gold medalists for China
Asian Games silver medalists for China
Setters (volleyball)
Volleyball players at the 2020 Summer Olympics
Olympic volleyball players of China
21st-century Chinese women